Padilla Municipality may refer to:
 Padilla Municipality, Chuquisaca, in Chuquisaca Department Bolivia
 Padilla Municipality, Tamaulipas, Mexico
 Padilla Municipality, Cauca, Colombia

Municipality name disambiguation pages